Cool Love is a song by American rock group Pablo Cruise, from their album Reflector in 1981 (see 1981 in music).

Background
David Jenkins sings the lead vocal on this ballad, telling his lover some of the ways their love is "cool" and summing it up that "cool love baby, that's what it's all about."

Charts
It was released as a single, the fifth and final Top 40 hit for the band, and reached No. 13 on the Billboard Hot 100.

Weekly charts

Year-end charts

References

1981 singles
Pablo Cruise songs
1981 songs
A&M Records singles
Song recordings produced by Tom Dowd
Songs written by Cory Lerios